The Flying Machines FM250 Vampire is a Czech ultralight and light-sport aircraft, designed and produced by Flying Machines s.r.o. of Rasošky, introduced at the Sport Aircraft Show held in Sebring, Florida in 2007. The aircraft is supplied as a complete ready-to-fly-aircraft.

Design and development
The aircraft was designed to comply with the Fédération Aéronautique Internationale microlight rules and US light-sport aircraft rules. It features a cantilever low-wing, a two-seats-in-side-by-side configuration enclosed cockpit under a bubble canopy that hinges forward, fixed tricycle landing gear and a single engine in tractor configuration.

The aircraft is made from composite materials and features a wet wing. Standard engines available are the  Rotax 912UL or the  Rotax 912ULS four-stroke powerplant. Full dual controls are provided, with the exception of wheel brakes, which are left seat only.

Variants
FM250 Vampire
Original model, introduced in 2007
FM250 Vampire II
Improved model, introduced in 2011.
FM250 Mystique
Model for the US light-sport aircraft category, with longer wings. The Mystique is a Federal Aviation Administration approved special light-sport aircraft.

Specifications (FM250 Vampire II)

References

External links

2000s Czech ultralight aircraft
Light-sport aircraft
Single-engined tractor aircraft